Wilensky's Light Lunch, also styled as simply Wilensky to conform to Bill 101, is a kosher-style lunch counter located at 34 Fairmount Avenue West in Montreal, Quebec, Canada. Opened in 1932 by Moe Wilensky, the restaurant was immortalized in Mordecai Richler's novel, The Apprenticeship of Duddy Kravitz. Scenes in the film version of the book were shot in the restaurant.

Products
Wilensky's is most famous for its Special: a grilled salami-from-beef and bologna-from-beef sandwich with mustard on a kaiser roll, pressed flat from the grill — mustard is compulsory, as a sign in the restaurant announces. Though recognized as part of Montreal's Jewish community, the restaurant is not kosher. Their soft drinks are still mixed by hand.

History
The restaurant was originally located at the corner of St. Urbain Street and Fairmount Avenue in Montreal's Mile End district. It moved to its current location in 1952  and was run by the founder's widow Ruth Wilensky (until 2012), his son Asher, daughter Sharon and granddaughter Alisa.

Wilensky's Special
The famous Wilensky's special sandwich is a grilled bologna sandwich. It was included in Travel + Leisure magazine's May 2012 edition's article about the 'Best Sandwiches From Around the World', written by Jonathan Gold. It was also featured in the second episode of The Mind of a Chef PBS series with Anthony Bourdain and David Chang.

Gallery

See also

 Fairmount Bagel
 Historic Jewish Quarter, Montreal
 List of delicatessens

References

External links

 Official website

1932 establishments in Quebec
Ashkenazi Jewish culture in Montreal
History of Montreal
Jewish delicatessens in Canada
Jews and Judaism in Montreal
Le Plateau-Mont-Royal
Lunch counters
Montreal cuisine
Restaurants established in 1932
Restaurants in Montreal